The 16th Stinkers Bad Movie Awards were released by the Hastings Bad Cinema Society in 1994 to honour the worst films the film industry had to offer in 1993. For the first time in Stinkers' history, there were additional categories to be included besides just Worst Picture. Such categories are shown below along with Worst Picture and its dishonourable mentions, which are films that were considered for Worst Picture but ultimately failed to make the final ballot (19 total). All winners are highlighted.

Winners and Nominees

Worst Picture

Dishonourable Mentions

 The Beverly Hillbillies (Fox)
 Body of Evidence (MGM/UA)
 Born Yesterday (Hollywood)
 Cliffhanger (Sony)
 Coneheads (Paramount)
 Dazed and Confused (Gramercy)
 Dennis the Menace (Warner Bros.)
 Gettysburg (New Line)
 Indecent Proposal (Paramount)
 Look Who's Talking Now (Sony)
 Made in America (Warner Bros.)
 Poetic Justice (Sony)
 Short Cuts (Fine Line)
 So I Married An Axe Murderer (Sony)
 Super Mario Bros. (Hollywood)
 Teenage Mutant Ninja Turtles 3 (New Line)
 The Temp (Paramount)
 Wayne's World 2 (Paramount)
 Weekend at Bernie's II (Sony)

Other Categories

References

Stinkers Bad Movie Awards
1993 film awards